Department of Airports may refer to:

Department of Airports (Thailand), a government department of Thailand
Los Angeles World Airports, a department of the City of Los Angeles